Shuckling (also written as shokeling), from the Yiddish word meaning "to shake", is the ritual swaying of worshippers during Jewish prayer, usually forward and back but also from side to side.

History
This practice can be traced back to at least the 8th century, and possibly as far back as Talmudic times. It was said of Rabbi Akiva that when he prayed by himself he would start in one corner and end up in another, because of all his kneeling and bowing; this link was noted by Maharil (14th century). The practice was mentioned by Yehuda Halevi in the 12th century. By the 13th century, Jews in Europe were “known for their shokeling during prayer.” However, the practice was opposed by the kabbalist Isaac Luria, as well as by 19th-century Jewish religious reformers. Jiří Langer gives a vivid description of shokeling among Belz Chassidim in early 20th century Europe.

Interpretations
Simon Brainin thinks that the practice was historically done "to afford the body exercise during study and prayer, which took up a large portion of the time of a great number of Jews".

Yehuda Halevi (12th century) wrote that the habit began as a result of a shortage of books, forcing people to hover over a single codex laid on the ground, each one bending in turn to read a passage.

Moshe Isserlis (16th century) mentioned a custom to sway during Torah study to recall the giving of the Torah in which the people trembled, and to sway during prayer to recall  which speaks of "all of one's bones" praising God.

Shuckeling is believed to increase concentration and emotional intensity. In Chassidic lore, it is seen as an expression of the soul's desire to abandon the body and reunite itself with its source, similar to a flame's shaking back and forth as if to free itself from the wick.

The Baal Shem Tov, the 18th century founder of Hasidic Judaism, notes in his ethical testament, Tzavaat HaRivash, that the swaying in prayer is similar and connected to the act of copulation. He writes, "prayer is zivug (coupling) with the Shechinah. Just as there is motion at the beginning of coupling, so, too, one must move (sway) at the beginning of prayer. Thereafter one can stand still, without motion, attached to the Shechinah with great deveikut."

References

External links
 The Meaning of Shokeling
 "Rosh Hashanah Rock Anthem"

Jewish services
Jewish prayer and ritual texts